The name Sally has been used for thirteen tropical cyclones worldwide: one in the Atlantic Ocean, nine in the Western Pacific Ocean, and three in the Southern Hemisphere.

In the Atlantic Ocean:
 Hurricane Sally (2020) – made landfall in Alabama as a Category 2 hurricane. A slow-moving storm that dropped heavy rain on multiple Gulf coast states; earliest eighteenth named storm on record.

In the Western Pacific Ocean:
 Typhoon Sally (1954) (T5421), Category 5 super typhoon that was miles from making landfall in the Philippines before curving back into open waters.
 Tropical Storm Sally (1959) (T5902, 03W)
 Typhoon Sally (1961) (T6122, 54W)
 Typhoon Sally (1964) (T6418, 27W, Aring), made landfall in the Philippines as a Category 5 typhoon.  
 Typhoon Sally (1967) (T6702, 02W, Bebeng)
 Tropical Storm Sally (1970) (T7005, 05W) 
 Typhoon Sally (1972) (T7229, 31W)
 Typhoon Sally (1976) (T7608, 08W, Isang) 
 Typhoon Sally (1996) (T9623, 23W, Maring), a Category 5 typhoon that made landfall in a similar location in the Philippines as Typhoon Sally of 1964, at a similar intensity, before going on to make landfall in China. 

In the Southern Hemisphere:  
 Cyclone Sally (1971), a severe cyclone that made landfall in Australia. 
 Cyclone Sally (1986), impacted the Cook Islands.
 Cyclone Sally (2005), churned in the open ocean.

Atlantic hurricane set index articles
Pacific typhoon set index articles
Australian region cyclone set index articles
South Pacific cyclone set index articles